Amblyseius aerialis is a species of mite in the family Phytoseiidae.

References

aerialis
Articles created by Qbugbot
Animals described in 1955